Gaudentia Mugosi Kabaka (born 15 April 1949) is a Tanzanian CCM politician and a special seat at Member of Parliament since 2005. She is the current Minister of Labour and Employment.

References

1949 births
Living people
Chama Cha Mapinduzi MPs
Tanzanian MPs 2010–2015
Government ministers of Tanzania
Jangwani Girls Secondary School alumni
University of Dar es Salaam alumni
Tanzanian schoolteachers